Random Acts of Violence is a 2019 slasher film based on the 2010 eponymous graphic novel written by Jimmy Palmiotti and Justin Gray, and illustrated by Giancarlo Caracuzzo. The film is produced and directed by Jay Baruchel, who wrote the screenplay with Jesse Chabot, and stars Jesse Williams, Jordana Brewster, and Baruchel. The film follows Todd Walkley (Williams), a comic book creator whose works are used as inspiration for a string of real-life murders.

The film entered development in 2011 when Baruchel and Chabot were first hired to adapt the screenplay. Attempts to begin production failed several times in subsequent years; principal photography took place between August 2018 and September 2018.

Random Acts of Violence debuted at the 2019 Fantastic Fest, and was released theatrically by Telefilm Canada in Canada on July 31, 2020, followed by a release in the United States on August 20 via streaming by Shudder. The film received polarized reviews from critics, who both praised and criticized the violent visuals, messages, and special effects.

Premise

Cast 

 Jesse Williams as Todd Walkley, a comic book writer and the creator of Slasherman.
 Jordana Brewster as Kathy, Todd's girlfriend.
 Niamh Wilson as Aurora, Todd's assistant.
 Jay Baruchel as Ezra, Todd's best friend and the owner of Hard Calibre Comics.

Production

Development 
Writing partners Jay Baruchel and Jesse Chabot were provided a copy of the one-shot comic Random Acts of Violence in 2010. They met with publisher Kickstart Comics about a separate project, and were later hired to write the film adaptation in May 2011. Comic co-writer Jimmy Palmiotti praised the hiring, and also said that "having [Baruchel] also star in it would be a super bonus", suggesting him for either of the lead roles.

The project was not discussed publicly again until a January 2015 interview, where Baruchel revealed that financing and casting had been completed and that he was attempting to film the project that year. He also said that he "might get to direct that this year as well" and announced various crew members, including editor Jason Eisener, cinematographer Bobby Shore, make-up artist Paul Jones, and composer Matthew Good. In a 2019 interview, Baruchel credited Eisener for pushing him to direct the film.

Filming 
In July 2018, Jesse Williams, Jordana Brewster, and Niamh Wilson were announced to lead the cast. Williams was cast as Todd Walkley, the creator of the fictional comic character Slasherman. Brewster will portray his girlfriend Kathy, Wilson will play his assistant Aurora, and Baruchel was also confirmed to be starring as Todd's best friend Ezra. By August 2018, principal photography had begun in Toronto and lasted until September 2018. According to Baruchel, filming lasted for "technically 20, but really 19 days" and included shoots in Hamilton, Ontario.

Post-production 
By October 2018, Baruchel was working on editing the film, balancing his time between an editing suite set up in his basement and promotion of How to Train Your Dragon: The Hidden World (2019). In a February 2019 interview, Baruchel gave more insight on the film by stating, "We’re trying our best to give the world something interesting and unique and legitimately scary. So it goes very hard and hopefully, if we’ve done our jobs, it’ll have something to say about the genre itself. It’s a horror flick that has as much of a brain as a set of fangs to it. I think it should f**k people up, but also leave them thinking about a bunch of sh*t – that’s the goal." In a May 2019 interview, Baruchel said "[he is] currently in post-production on the film; hopefully its scary and ruins people's ability to dream normally." Post-production concluded on August 13, 2019.

Release 
Random Acts of Violence premiered at the 2019 Fantastic Fest on September 19, 2019. Elevation Pictures released the film in Canada on July 31, 2020, before debuting it on Shudder in the United States on August 20, 2020.

Reception 
The website's critics consensus reads, "Random Acts of Violence falls short as an intelligent analysis of its themes, but viewers looking for chance instances of brutality won't be let down." At Metacritic, the film has a weighted average score of 39 out of 100, based on eight critics, indicating "generally unfavorable reviews".

After its premiere at the 2019 Fantastic Fest, the film garnered positive reviews. Hazem Fahmy, of Film Inquiry, praised "the timely message" and the way the film delivers its central theme. Amelia Emberwing, of Birth.Movies.Death., praised the film as "quick, bloody and brimming with some genuinely solid special effects". Matthew Monagle, of The Playlist, gave the film a grade B−, also praising the violence and the film's commentary on the media. Michael Gingold, of Rue Morgue, praised the film's "potent meta look at the genre".

Conversely, Chris Knight, of National Post, gave a negative review, criticizing the violence and "the lack of humor". Roger Moore, of Movie Nation, also gave a negative review, criticizing the film for "not doing much more than stumble and angst-out from one killing to the next". Josh Bell, of Comic Book Resources, felt that the film "seems contemptuous of horror fans". Cath Clarke, of The Guardian, described it as an "exasperating serial killer-slasher". Brian Tallerico, of RogerEbert.com, took issue with the film thinking "it's saying something about gratuitous violence and exploitation of real tragedy but is even more hypocritically hollow than the films it purports to criticize".

References

External links 
 

2019 films
2019 horror films
2019 horror thriller films
2010s American films
2010s Canadian films
2010s English-language films
2010s slasher films
American slasher films
Canadian slasher films
English-language Canadian films
Films based on American comics
Films based on Image Comics
Films set in Toronto
Films shot in Hamilton, Ontario
Films shot in Toronto
Live-action films based on comics
Shudder (streaming service) original programming